Onyx Equinox is a Mexican-American adult animated streaming television series created by Sofia Alexander for Crunchyroll. It is based on the mythologies of Mesoamerica, featuring deities of Aztec, Maya and Zapotec myth, while also making references to the Olmecs.

The series premiered on November 21, 2020. Alexander said that she hoped that fans of Western animation would "see the appeal of action-drama animation for adults." While Alexander was initially nervous about pitching the show due to the lack of "stories about Mesoamerica," a Crunchyroll executive, Marisa Balkus, loved the pitch, and the show became "the first original series to be produced entirely out of Crunchyroll Studios."

Synopsis
The Mexican god of the underworld, Mictlantecuhtli, has begun stealing blood sacrifices from the other gods, culminating in a Zapotec city being leveled. To these ends, Quetzalcoatl decides to close the gates to the underworld, but can't due to said gates being made of obsidian, which is toxic against the gods. So instead he makes a bet with Tezcatlipoca: he will find a human, "the lowest of the low", and crown him his champion so he will close the gates before the equinox, when Tezcatlipoca will kill off humanity. Tezcatlipoca agrees to the bet, but sends his champion Yaotl along as an emissary so Quetzalcoatl doesn't cheat.

Quetzalcoatl chooses Izel, a slave who lost his sister to blood sacrifice.

Characters

The Champions
 Izel (Olivia J Brown): A young Aztec boy who lost his sister to blood sacrifice and begins to hate humanity for it.
 Yaotl (Alejandro Vargas-Lugo): A jaguar emissary of Tezcatlipoca who is harsh on Izel trying to fulfill his destiny.
 Yun (Patrick Pedrazza): A kind Maya teenager who plays Ulama ballgames and the twin brother of K'in.
 K'in (Juan Arturo Maldonado): A ruthless Maya teenager who plays Ulama ballgames and the twin brother of Yun.
 Zyanya (Carolina Ravassa): A warrior Zapotec woman who lost her city, destroyed by the king of the underworld, Mictlantecuhtli.
 Xanastaku (Kimberly Woods): A Totonac priestess who desires to redeem her dark past.

The Gods
 Cástulo Guerra as Mictlantecuhtli
 Arin Hanson as Tezcatlipoca
 Zeus Mendoza as Quetzalcoatl
 Fayna Sanchez as The Healer/Mictecacihuatl
 Alicia Ross as Tzitzimitl
 SungWon Cho as Xolotl.

Supporting Characters
 Sofia Alexander as K'i'ik, Meque, and Nelli
 Sanchez & Octavio Solorio Zyanya's parents.

Episodes

Release 
The show was released on November 21, 2020. A trailer was released on June 25. A second trailer showing off the show's characters was released on September 4, 2020, with a final trailer on October 29. On November 11, 2020, Crunchyroll announced that the series would be dubbed in English, Spanish, Portuguese, French, and German upon release. Crunchyroll released the remaining seven episodes of the series on December 26, 2020 due to a high demand of viewers wanting to binge the series rather than waiting weekly for new episodes through February 2021.

On May 18, 2021, it was announced Sentai Filmworks picked up the home video rights. It was released on Blu-ray on February 22, 2022 as Onyx Equinox Complete Collection.

In January 2022, Alexander revealed that the budget of Onyx Equinox was "near 1/3 of a lot of western shows" and said a main reason they unionized was because she "threatened to leave before production started." She also said that she was grateful to Crunchyroll because she wouldn't have been able to have a story about grief and trauma and have LGBTQ characters on other platforms.

Awards
In early December 2020, Onyx Equinox creator Sofia Alexander received Animation Magazine's "New Voice of the Year" award.

Reception
Ederlyn Peralta of CBR said that the series is unique, with "mesmerizing and highly-detailed character designs for the gods" of Mesoamerican culture and noted that while it is an adult animation, due to the "gore, profanity and sexual content," it, in their opinion, fails to have "quality character development for Izel and his comrades," and reported that some viewers believe that the protagonists are annoying and unlikeable because of their "whining." In contrast, Monique Thomas and Steve Jones of Anime News Network praised the series, calling it a "big landmark for animation," as it is the first animated series produced by Crunchyroll and has a "diverse staff." They also argued that the series has more in common with Western animation than anime, arguing it is anime inspired, and an original "action-fantasy for adults" while pointing out the curse words and violence. Thomas and Jones had one criticism, not of the show, but of Crunchyroll, asking why the show did not have English subtitles, leading one of the reviewers to watch using the Spanish subtitles instead. Melissa Camacho of family-oriented non-profit Common Sense Media noted the "brutal violence" and nudity in the series while calling it "an adult-oriented anime series set in ancient Mesoamerican history" with a "great plot" that is "worthy of your time." Raye Rodriguez, the creator of High Guardian Spice, recommended the series, calling it a "dark adult animation" which has "unique storytelling," beautiful music and art, and encouraged his followers to help it get a second season. Anime Feminist was more critical, saying that while there is "genuine enthusiasm" for the series, the first episode left them feeling angry, tired, and emotionally drained, arguing that the depiction of human sacrifices is a big gripe they have with the series, saying as it is an "overused narrative" in popular depictions, and asked "who was Onyx Enquinox made for?"

References

External links
 Onyx Equinox on Crunchyroll
 

2020 American television series debuts
2020 American television series endings
2020s American adult animated television series
2020s American LGBT-related animated television series
2020s American science fiction television series
American adult animated action television series
American adult animated fantasy television series
American adult animated science fiction television series
American adult animated web series
Anime-influenced Western animated television series
Crunchyroll Originals
English-language television shows
Mesoamerica in fiction
Mesoamerican mythology in popular culture
Sentai Filmworks
Television series based on multiple mythologies
Television series by Sony Pictures Television
Science fantasy television series